Satendra Singh Lohiya (born 6 July 1987) is an Indian swimmer with 70% disability. On 24 June 2018 he crossed the English Channel as part of a swimming relay team which, for the first time saw four para swimmers from India cross the English Channel.  He completed the channel in 12 hours and 26 minutes, setting a new record. He has been selected for the Tenzing Norgay Adventure Award 2019 for first Indian para swimmer which was given by the Honorable President of India Ram Nath Kovind and The Prime Minister of India Shri Narendra Modi also recognized and appreciated Satendra Singh Lohiya's hard work and blessed him for his future endeavor. He received Vikram Award, the highest state-level sports awards in Madhya Pradesh, for swimming from the Chief Minister Shri Shivraj Singh Chauhan, MP on 23 December 2014.

Early life
Satendra was born like a normal child in a small village of district Bhind Madhya Pradesh India in 1987, but due to lack of proper treatment for a serious illness within fifteen days of his birth, his legs veins shrink due to which both his legs became 70% disabled. He got tough swimming training under the guidance of  Dr. virendra kumar dabad for two year and then participated in his first National Paralympics Swimming Championship 2009 held at Kolkata.

Swimming career 

XXII National Paralympic Swimming Championship, 11th -13th November 2022 Guwahati Assam
 1 Gold & 1 Silver 
North Channel Swimming (36 km.) 
 As Part of 06 Person Relay Swimming Team. Northern Ireland UK 
2022 XXI National Paralympic Swimming Championship 2022 Udaipur
 2 Silver 
2019 Ctalina Channel
 2019 Ctalina Channel Indian Para Relay Team including  successfully crossed the Catalina Channel with the timing of 11 hours 34 minutes today also set up asian record.
2018 English Channel
 2018 English Channel swimming as part of 4 person para swimming relay team.
XVI National Paralympic Swimming Championship Jaipur
 2 Gold, 1 Silver, 1 Bronze.
XVII National Paralympic Swimming Championship Udaypur
 2 Gold, 1 Silver
State Open Championship Sydney Olympic Park Aquatic Center Australia 2017
 1 Gold
Arabian sea Mumbai 2017
 Open water Sea Swimming feat of 33 Kilo Meter in Arabian sea Mumbai 4 May 2017
Para – International Swimming Championship Gatineau, Canada 2016
 2 Silvers, 1 Bronze

Awards
Satendra received National Award for the Best Sport Person of the Year from the Vice President of India at New Delhi, Award Given by the social justice of india on 3 December 2019. He also received the Tenzing Norgay National Adventure Award 2019. Recipient of Outstanding Young Person OF India Award Winner 2021 from President of JCI India in Recognition of Excellence in the Para Swimming Sport. Recipient of JCI Gwalior Ratna Alankar 2022 Outstanding Young Person From President JCI Gwalior in Recognition to outstanding person achievement.

References

External links

1987 births
Living people
Indian male swimmers
English Channel swimmers
Recipients of the Tenzing Norgay National Adventure Award
20th-century Indian people
21st-century Indian people